is a passenger railway station located in Midori-ku, Chiba, Japan operated by the East Japan Railway Company (JR East).

Lines

Station layout
The station consists of a single island platform with an elevated station building built over the tracks and platform. The station has a Midori no Madoguchi staffed ticket office.

Platform

History
Kamatori Station was opened on 15 June 1952 as a station on the Japan National Railways. A new station building was completed on March 23, 1986. The station became part of the JR East network upon the privatization of the Japan National Railways (JNR) on 1 April 1987.

Passenger statistics
In fiscal 2019, the station was used by an average of 20,693 passengers daily (boarding passengers only).

Surrounding area
 Chiba City Midori Ward Office
 Chiba City Kamatori Community Center
 Chiba City Midori Library

References

External links

 JR East Station information 

Railway stations in Japan opened in 1952
Railway stations in Chiba Prefecture
Sotobō Line
Railway stations in Chiba (city)